Janthina pallida, also known as the pale janthina, is a species of holoplanktonic sea snail, a marine gastropod mollusk in the family Epitoniidae, the violet snails or purple storm snails.

Description
The maximum recorded shell length is 28 mm.

Habitat 
Minimum recorded depth is 0 m. Maximum recorded depth is 0 m.

References

Epitoniidae
Gastropods described in 1840